Filippo Missori (born 24 March 2004) is an Italian professional football player who plays as a right-back for Serie A club Roma.

Club career 
Filippo Missori started his career in Romulea—a club from the Italian capital—before joining AS Roma in 2013. Having won the national scudetto with both the under-15 and the under-17 in Rome, he made his first appearance in the professional squad under José Mourinho on the 24 October 2021, figuring on the team sheet for a Serie A game against Napoli, along with his Primavera teammate Felix Afena-Gyan.

He made his professional debut for Roma on the 25 November 2021, replacing Henrikh Mkhitaryan for the last 10 minutes of a 4–0 home Conference league win against Zorya Luhansk. By doing so he became the first 2004-born footballer to ever play for Roma, or for any Italian club in a European competition.

On 10 July 2022, Missori officially renewed his contract with the club until 2026.

International career 
A youth international for Italy since the under-15, Missori became the captain of the under-18 selection in 2021.

He was included in the under-18 squad that took part in the 2022 Mediterranean Games in Oran, Algeria, with the Azzurrini eventually winning the silver medal after losing 1-0 against France in the final match.

In December 2022, he was involved in a training camp led by the Italian senior national team's manager, Roberto Mancini, and aimed to the most promising national talents.

Career statistics

Club

Honours 
Roma

 UEFA Europa Conference League: 2021–22

References

External links

2004 births
Living people
Italian footballers
Italy youth international footballers
Association football defenders
Footballers from Rome
A.S. Roma players
Footballers from Lazio
Mediterranean Games silver medalists for Italy
Mediterranean Games medalists in football
Competitors at the 2022 Mediterranean Games
21st-century Italian people
UEFA Europa Conference League winning players